Mila Marinova (born 3 June 1974) is a Bulgarian rhythmic gymnast.

Biography 
Marinova was born in Sofia, Bulgaria.  She started her career in SLAVIA Club at the age of 7 and finished it in the famous LEVSKI Spartak. Since the beginning of her taking up gymnastics until the very end she went consecutively under the coaching of Kostandinka Atanassova, Efrossina Angelova, Lusha Butchvarova and Neshka Robeva.

She got married in 1996 (Harty) and gave birth to a son in 1997. In 1998, she decided to move back to competition.
She became the 1990 Bulgarian National champion, she came in 4th at the Grand Prix Final. Marinova then competed at the 1990 Goodwill Games and won the silver medal in all-around. At the 1991 World Championships she placed 3rd in All-around behind Ukrainaians Oxana Skaldina and Olexandra Tymoshenko.

In 1992 she flew to the USA and now live and work in Jacksonville. She got married in 1996 (Harty) and gave birth to a son in 1997. In 1998, she briefly returned to competition competing at the U.S. Championships.

References

External links

1974 births
Living people
Bulgarian rhythmic gymnasts
Sportspeople from Jacksonville, Florida
Bulgarian emigrants to the United States
American sportswomen
Medalists at the Rhythmic Gymnastics World Championships
Goodwill Games medalists in gymnastics
Competitors at the 1990 Goodwill Games
21st-century American women